Herbert IV may refer to:

 Herbert IV, Count of Meaux (circa 950–995)
 Herbert IV, Count of Vermandois (1028–1080)